KSRX (97.5 FM) is a radio station licensed to Sterling, Colorado, United States.  The station is owned by Media Logic LLC.

References

External links

SRX
Sterling, Colorado